is a Japanese cyclist, who currently rides for UCI Continental team .

Major results

2015
 Asian Under-23 Road Championships
1st Road race
3rd Individual time trial 
 1st  Time trial, National Under-23 Road Championships
 9th Gran Premio di Poggiana
2018
 7th Overall Tour de Lombok Mandalika
2021
 3rd Oita Urban Classic
 5th Overall Tour of Japan
 6th Road Race, National Road Championships
2022
 2nd Overall Tour of Thailand

References

External links

1993 births
Living people
Japanese male cyclists